Viviana Andrea Callahan Vargas (born July 14, 1980) is a Chilean ski mountaineer.

Callahan attended the college of physical education (LICAF) of the University of Santiago (USACH).

Viviana Callahan is an outstanding Chilean mountaineer with a vast career dedicated to sports ascensions and guided education. She currently works as an instructor at the National Outdoor Leadership School (NOLS). As a mountain guide she has participated in dozens of expeditions to Aconcagua, a mountain that she has climbed 12 times. 

In 2005, she participated in the 1st South American Ski Mountaineering Championship, and won Bronze.

In 2011 she participated in the first Chilean expedition to Dhaulagiri (8,167m) with María Paz Ibarra and María Fajardo. Unfortunately the trio of climbers did not reach the summit by 100 meters due to bad weather.

References

External links 
 Viviana Andrea Callahan Vargas at SkiMountaineering.org
 Viviana Callahan interview, Revista Escalando #24, pages 36-37

1980 births
Living people
Chilean female ski mountaineers
University of Santiago, Chile alumni